"A Perfect Sky" is Bonnie Pink's twenty-fifth single and first from the album Thinking Out Loud. The single was released under the Warner Music Japan label on June 28, 2006.

Track listing
A Perfect Sky
Free
Interlude -Siesta-
A Perfect Sky (Instrumental)

Oricon Sales Chart

2006 singles
Bonnie Pink songs
2006 songs
Warner Music Japan singles
Songs written by Bonnie Pink